George Perkins may refer to:

Politicians
George Clement Perkins (1839–1923), U.S. Republican politician and governor of California
George B. Perkins (1874–1955), American politician and businessman
George D. Perkins (1840–1914), U.S. Representative from Iowa
George Perkins Marsh (1801–1882), American diplomat and early environmentalist
George Walbridge Perkins (1862–1920), American progressive leader; businessman
George Walbridge Perkins Jr. (1895–1960), Assistant Secretary of State and US Ambassador to NATO

Others
George H. Perkins (1836–1899), Civil War era United States Navy officer
George Henry Perkins (1844–1933), American naturalist
George W. Perkins (producer), American film and television producer
George Perkins (cricketer) (1864–1933), English cricketer
George Perkins (singer) (1942–2013), American soul singer